The Sacred Wars can refer to several wars over control of Delphi:

First Sacred War (595 BC - 585 BC), between the Amphictyonic League of Delphi and the city of Kirrha.
Second Sacred War (449 BC - 448 BC), an indirect confrontation between Athens and Sparta.
Third Sacred War (356 BC - 346 BC), between the forces of Thebes and Phocis for control of Delphi.
Fourth Sacred War (339 BC), between Philip II of Macedon and the city of Amphissa in Lokris.
Fifth Sacred War (281 - 280 BC), between the Aitolian League and the Spartan king Areus I.

Archaic Greece